Captain Joseph Barlow Ranson OBE was a commander of White Star Line liners. He was born in 1864. His marine career began at the age of 14, when he joined the Pacific Steam Navigation Company. He joined the White Star Line in 1891 and retired in February 1921.

Rescue of RMS Republic
Ranson was the captain of the ship , which rescued 1700 passengers and crew from the stricken liner  (sailing from New York to Gibraltar and Mediterranean ports) when it collided with the Italian liner Florida in fog off the island of Nantucket, Massachusetts on January 23, 1909. Submarine bells, depth sounding, and radio signals were used by Ranson to locate the drifting RMS Republic.

Ranson was awarded the Lloyd’s Life Saving Medal "as an honorary acknowledgement of his extraordinary exertions in contributing to the saving of life on the occasion of the steamships Republic and Florida being in collision in the vicinity of the Nantucket Lightship on the 23 January 1909".

As a joint expression of the gratitude of saloon passengers from the White Star's Baltic and Republic, Ranson received a special commemorative award CQD "Gold" Medal, in recognition of the gallantry of the seamen who had taken part in the rescue.

American wrist-watch millionaire, Ralph Ingersoll, undertook the striking and distribution of the medals, presented to all crew members and captains involved in the incident.

Sinking of Titanic
As captain of RMS Baltic, he was sailing from New York City to Liverpool on 11 April 1912. On 14 April 1912, Baltic warned  by radio that icebergs had been sighted. Titanic hit an iceberg at 11:40 that same night. This warning became notable after the sinking when Edward Smith took the warning from the bridge and handed it to White Star Line managing director J. Bruce Ismay. He took it and reportedly later showed it to some other passengers. Ismay later said he gave the warning back when Captain Smith asked for it later that evening. Some Ismay critics have pointed to this as evidence that Ismay had convinced Captain Smith to increase the ship's speed, which Ismay denies, and that this was Captain Smith showing Ismay there was danger.

At 00:30, the ship Caronia relayed a CQ message from Titanic to the Baltic, and at 00:53 another CQD. At 01:15, Baltic responded "Please tell Titanic we are making towards her". At 01:35, Baltic reported receiving the message "Engine room getting flooded" from Titanic, and responded "We are rushing to you".

Later in the morning, at 08:07 Baltic radioed  to offer assistance with survivors. Baltic travelled 134 miles west toward the scene of the sinking of Titanic before turning back toward Liverpool. Ranson subsequently provided testimony about the warnings of icebergs and standard operating procedure, to the British inquiry into the Titanic disaster on June 18, 1912. In "EXPENSES OF INQUIRY PAID BY THE BOARD OF TRADE", Ranson is shown to have received 15 shillings in his capacity as master of Baltic.

Other awards
Ranson received an O.B.E. as a Senior Captain in World War I. He commanded the Baltic from the outbreak of hostilities until October 1915, and thereafter, the Adriatic until the end of the War. He was also awarded the British War and Mercantile Marine Medals.

Other forms of name (including misspellings)
J B Ranson
J Barlow Ransom
Joseph B Ranson
John Barlow Ranson (as listed in transcriptions of Titanic Enquiry testimony, in error)
J. B. Ransom (as minted on his C.Q.D Gold Medal, in error)

Photos
Photos of J.B. Ranson with Captain Inman Sealby of the RMS Republic are known to exist (on the RMS Republic official salvage web site, see ).

Known commands
23 January 1909 Ranson is the commander of Baltic. He rescues the passengers of Republic after a collision with Florida.
11 April 1912 Captain Ranson sails Baltic across the Atlantic, warning Titanic of icebergs. He turns the ship around to participate in the rescue effort.
12 December 1915 Captain Ranson is recorded as the commander of RMS Britannic, sailing into Liverpool dock to complete commissioning as a hospital ship.
18 September 1918 Captain Ranson is listed as J. B. Ranson, O.B.E., Lieut. Commander R.N.R. (ret'd) and the commander of RMS Adriatic on its voyage from Liverpool to New York City.

Quotes
In a magazine article about the use of radio to locate RMS Republic in fog, he said "the passenger on a well-equipped transatlantic liner is safer than he can be anywhere else in the world" . 
Asked about icebergs in the Titanic inquiry he said; "We go full speed whether there is ice reported or not", "I always keep my course whether ice is reported or not, on the track"

Footnotes

External links
The Outlook, February 6, 1909 Article Describing the Rescue of the RMS Republic
Testimony to the Titanic Enquiry

1864 births
Officers of the Order of the British Empire
Year of death missing